The following is a list of rulers of Sardinia, in particular, of the monarchs of the Kingdom of Sardinia and Corsica from 1323 and then of the Kingdom of Sardinia from 1479 to 1861.

Early history
Owing to the absence of written sources, little is known of the history of the Nuraghic civilization which constructed impressive megalithic structures between the 18th and the 12th centuries BCE.  The first accounts of Sardinia are from Greek sources, but relate more to myth than to historical reality; an African or Iberian hero, Norax, named the city of Nora; Sardo, a son of Hercules, gave the island its name; one of his nephews, Iolaus, founded the city of Olbia. Greek colonization of the city of Olbia has been confirmed by recent archaeological excavations. Towards the end of the 6th century BC, Sardinia was conquered by the Carthaginians and in 238 BC it was occupied by the Romans for c.1000 years, with a period under the dominion of the Vandals in the 5th and 6th centuries CE.

Early medieval rulers
Godas 533–535
According to Procopius, Godas was a Vandal governor of Sardinia who rebelled against his king, Gelimer, who ruled northern Africa and Sardinia. Procopius wrote that Godas behaved like a king, but it was a short-lived kingdom. Godas was defeated and killed after two years by an expedition from Carthage led by King Gelimer's brother, Tzazo. Shortly afterwards, Roman troops sent by Emperor Justinianus and led by General Belisarius, totally annihilated the Vandal kingdom and Sardinia returned to Roman administration.

Judges

Before the Kingdom of Sardinia was founded, the rulers of the island were known as archons (ἄρχοντες in Greek) or "judges" (iudices in Latin, judices in Sardinian, giudici in Italian). The island was organized into one "judicatus" from the 9th century. After the Muslim conquest of Sicily in the 9th century, the Byzantines (who ruled Sardinia) could no longer defend their isolated far western province. In all likelihood a local noble family came to power, still identifying themselves as vassals of the Byzantines but in reality independent since communication with Constantinople was very difficult.

Of those rulers, only two names are known: Salusios (Σαλούσιος) and the protospatharios Turcoturios (Tουρκοτούριος), who probably reigned some time in the 10th and 11th centuries. They were still closely linked to the Byzantines, both by a pact of ancient vassalage and culturally, with the use of the Greek language (in a country of the Romance language) and Byzantine art.

In the early 11th century, Muslims based in Spain attempted to conquer the island. The only records of that war are from Pisan and Genoese chronicles. The Christians won but afterwards the previous Sardinian kingdom had been undermined and was divided into four small judicati: Cagliari (Calari), Arborea (Arbaree), Gallura, Torres or Logudoro.

List of judges of Arborea, c. 1070–1410
List of judges of Cagliari, c. 1060–1258
List of judges of Gallura, c. 1070–1288
List of judges of Logudoro, c. 1060–1259

Occasionally, these rulers took the style of king (rex):
1113–1128 Constantine I, Judge of Torres
1128–1150 Gonario II, Judge of Torres

Nominal kings of Imperial appointment
Some rulers obtained the title King of Sardinia (Rex Sardiniae) by grant of the Holy Roman Emperor:

Barisone II of Arborea, 1164–1165 (by Emperor Frederick I, who officially renounced his title in a peace treaty with the other judices in 1165);
Enzo of Logudoro Hohenstaufen, 1238–1245, was the illegitimate son of Emperor Frederick II and was appointed by his father. In 1249, he was captured by his enemies and imprisoned in Bologna, where he died 23 years later.

None of these rulers had effective authority over the whole island. In 1269, an anti-imperial faction in Logudoro elected Philip of Sicily as king of all Sardinia, but this was never confirmed by the emperor or the pope and Philip never visited the island.

Kings of Sardinia and Corsica

James II of Aragon received royal investiture from Pope Boniface VIII in 1297 as Rex Sardiniae et Corsicae. The Aragonese did not take possession of the island until 1323, after a victorious military campaign against the Pisans. However, the Sardinian royal title did not have a specific line of succession and all kings used their own primary title.

House of Barcelona (Aragon), 1323–1410

|-
||James II of Aragon1323–1327||||10 August 1267Valenciason of Peter I and Constance of Sicily||Isabella of Castile1 December 1291 No childrenBlanche of Anjou29 October 129510 childrenMarie de Lusignan15 June 1315 No childrenElisenda de Montcada25 December 1322 No children||5 November 1327Barcelonaaged 60
|-
| Alfonso IV of Aragon1327–1336||  ||1299Naplesson of James II of Aragon and Blanche of Anjou|| Teresa d'Entença13147 childrenEleanor of Castile2 children || 27 January 1336Barcelonaaged 37
|-
| Peter IV of Aragon1336–1387 ||  ||5 October 1319Balaguerson of Alfonso IV and Teresa d'Entença||Maria of Navarre13382 children Leonor of Portugal1347No childrenEleanor of Sicily27 August 13494 children || 5 January 1387Barcelonaaged 68
|-
| John I of Aragon1387–1396||  ||27 December 1350Perpignanson of Peter IV of Aragon and Eleanor of Sicily||Martha of Armagnac27 March 13731 childYolande of Bar13803 children || 19 May 1396Foixàaged 46
|-
| Martin of Aragon1396–1410 ||  || 1356Gironason of Peter IV of Aragon and Eleanor of Sicily||Maria de Luna13 June 13724 childrenMargarita of Aragon-Prades17 September 1409No children||31 May 1410Barcelonaaged 54
|}

Coat of arms

House of Trastámara, 1412–1516

|-
| Ferdinand I of Aragon1412–1416 ||  || 27 November 1380Medina del Camposon of John I of Castile and Eleanor of Aragon||Eleanor of Alburquerque13948 children|| 2 April 1416Igualadaaged 36
|-
| Alfonso V of Aragon1416–1458||  || 1396Medina del Camposon of Ferdinand I and Eleanor of Alburquerque||Maria of Castile1415No children|| 27 June 1458Naplesaged 52
|}

Coat of arms

Kings of Sardinia

House of Trastámara, 1412–1516

|-
| John II of Aragon1458–1479||  || 29 June 1398Medina del Camposon of Ferdinand I and Eleanor of Alburquerque|| Blanche I of Navarre6 November 14194 childrenJuana EnríquezApril 14442 children ||20 January 1479Barcelonaaged 80
|-
| Ferdinand II of Aragon1479–1516||  || 10 March 1452son of John II of Aragon and Juana Enriquez|| Isabella I of Castile19 October 14695 childrenGermaine of Foix1505No children ||23 January 1516Madrigalejoaged 63
|-
| Joanna of Castile1516–1555||  || 6 November 1479daughter of Ferdinand II of Aragon and Isabella I of Castile|| Philip IV of Burgundy, 14966 children|| 12 April 1555Madrigalejoaged 75
|}

Nominally co-monarch of her son Charles, Joanna was kept imprisoned almost during her whole reign.

House of Habsburg (Spanish branch), 1516–1700

|-
| Charles I of Spainco-king with his mother Joanna1516–1556 ||  || 24 February 1500Ghentson of Philip I of Castile and Joanna of Castile||Isabella of Portugal10 March 15263 children ||21 September 1558Yusteaged 58
|-
| Philip II of Spain1556–1598 ||  || 21 May 1527Valladolidson of Charles IV and Isabella of Portugal||Maria of Portugal15431 childMary I of England1554No childrenElisabeth of Valois15592 childrenAnna of Austria4 May 15705 children||13 September 1598Madridaged 71
|-
| Philip III of Spain1598–1621||  || 14 April 1578Madridson of Philip I and Anna of Austria||Margaret of Austria18 April 15995 children||31 March 1621Madridaged 42
|-
| Philip IV of Spain1621–1665||  || 8 April 1605Valladolidson of Philip II and Margaret of Austria||Elisabeth of Bourbon16157 childrenMariana of Austria16495 children||17 September 1665Madridaged 60
|-
| Charles II of Spain1665–1700||  || 6 November 1661Madridson of Philip III and Mariana of Austria||Maria Luisa of Orléans19 November 1679No childrenMaria Anna of Neuburg14 May 1690No children||1 November 1700Madridaged 38
|}

Coat of arms

House of Bourbon (Spanish branch) 1700–1708

|-
| Philip V of Spain1700–1708||  || 19 December 1683Versaillesson of Louis, Dauphin of France and Maria Anna of Bavaria||Maria Luisa of Savoy2 November 17014 childrenElisabeth of Parma24 December 17147 children||9 July 1746Madridaged 62
|}
Sardinia was taken over by Habsburg troops in 1708 during the War of the Spanish Succession in the name of the Habsburg claimant to the Spanish throne, "Charles III". At the end of the war, Sardinia remained in Charles' possession and, by the Treaty of Rastatt, was ceded to him.

Coat of arms

House of Habsburg (Austrian branch), 1708–1720

| Emperor Charles VI1708–1720 ||  || 1 October 1685Viennason of Leopold I, Holy Roman Emperor and Eleonore-Magdalena of Pfalz-Neuburg||Elisabeth Christine1 August 17084 children|| 20 October 1740Viennaaged 55
|}
Spanish forces invaded the kingdom in 1717 during the War of the Quadruple Alliance. The island was under Spanish military occupation until 1720, when it was given back to Emperor Charles VI who in turn ceded it to the Duke of Savoy by the Treaty of The Hague.

Coat of arms

House of Savoy, 1720–1861
The monarchs of the House of Savoy ruled from their mainland capital of Turin, but styled themselves primarily with the royal title of Sardinia as superior to their original lesser dignity as Dukes of Savoy. However, their numeral order continued the Savoyard list.

| Victor Amadeus II of Savoy17 February 1720 – 3 September 1730||  || 14 May 1666Turinson of Charles Emmanuel II, Duke of Savoy and Marie Jeanne of Savoy||Anne Marie d'Orléans, Princess of France10 April 16846 children||31 October 1732Moncalieriaged 66
|-
| Charles Emmanuel III of Savoy3 September 1730 – 20 February 1773||  || 27 April 1701Turinson of Victor Amadeus II of Sardinia and Anne Marie d'Orléans, Princess of France||Anne Christine of Sulzbach15 March 17221 childPolyxena of Hesse-Rotenburg20 August 17246 childrenElisabeth Therese of Lorraine5 March 17373 children||20 February 1773Turinaged 72
|-
| Victor Amadeus III of Savoy20 February 1773 – 16 October 1796||  ||26 June 1726Turinson of Charles Emmanuel III of Sardinia and Polyxena of Hesse-Rotenburg||Maria Antonietta of Spain31 May 175012 children||16 October 1796Moncalieriaged 70
|-
| Charles Emmanuel IV of Savoy16 October 1796 – 4 June 1802||  ||24 May 1751Turinson of Victor Amadeus III of Sardinia and Maria Antonietta of Spain||Marie Clotilde of France27 August 1775No children||6 October 1819Romeaged 68
|-
| Victor Emmanuel I of Savoy4 June 1802 – 12 March 1821||  ||24 July 1759Turinson of Victor Amadeus III of Sardinia and Maria Antonietta of Spain||Maria Teresa of Austria-Este21 April 17897 children||10 January 1824Moncalieriaged 64
|-
| Charles Felix of Savoy12 March 1821 – 27 April 1831||  ||6 April 1765Turinson of Victor Amadeus III of Sardinia and Maria Antonietta of Spain||Maria Cristina of Naples and Sicily7 March 1807No children||27 April 1831Turinaged 66
|-
| Charles Albert of Savoy27 April 1831 – 23 March 1849||  ||2 October 1798Turinson of Charles Emmanuel, Prince of Carignan and Maria Cristina of Saxony||Maria Theresa of Austria30 September 18173 children||28 July 1849Portoaged 50
|-
| Victor Emmanuel II of Savoy23 March 1849 – 17 March 1861 ||  ||14 March 1820Turinson of Charles Albert of Sardinia and Maria Theresa of Austria||Adelaide of Austria12 April 18428 childrenRosa Vercellana18 October 18692 children||9 January 1878Romeaged 57
|}

In 1861, after the annexation of other states in the Italian peninsula, the parliament of the Kingdom of Sardinia passed a law (Legge n. 4671, 17 marzo 1861) adding to the style of the sovereign the title of King of Italy. The monarchs retained the designation of King of Sardinia.

Coat of arms

Kings of Italy

House of Savoy, 1861–1946

| Victor Emmanuel II of Savoy17 March 1861 – 9 January 1878 ||  ||14 March 1820Turinson of Charles Albert of Sardinia and Maria Theresa of Austria||Adelaide of Austria12 April 18428 childrenRosa Vercellana18 October 18692 children||9 January 1878Romeaged 57
|-
| Umberto I of Italy9 January 1878 – 29 July 1900 ||  || 14 March 1844Turinson of Victor Emmanuel II of Savoy and Adelaide of Austria||Margherita of Savoy21 April 18681 child||29 July 1900Monzaaged 56
|-
| Victor Emmanuel III of Italy29 July 1900 – 9 May 1946 ||  || 11 November 1869Naplesson of Umberto I of Italy and Margherita of Savoy||Elena of Montenegro24 October 18965 children|| 28 December 1947Alexandriaaged 78
|-
|Umberto II of Italy9 May 1946 – 12 June 1946 ||  || 15 September 1904Racconigison of Victor Emmanuel III of Italy and Elena of Montenegro || Marie José of Belgium8 January 19304 children|| 18 March 1983Genevaaged 78
|}

The Kingdom of Italy was disestablished by an institutional referendum on 2 June 1946 and the Italian Republic was proclaimed.

Coat of arms

Notes

Sardinia

Kings of Italian states

et:Sardiinia kuningriik#Sardiinia kuningad (1297–1861)